Events from the year 1854 in art.

Events
 July 15 – The marriage of John Ruskin and Effie Gray is annulled.
 November 27 – André-Adolphe-Eugène Disdéri patents a method of producing carte de visite photographs in France.

Works

 Athena Protects the Young Hero, Berlin
 Gustave Courbet
 La rencontre ("The Meeting" or "Bonjour Monsieur Courbet") (Musée Fabre, Montpellier)
 The Wheat Sifters
 David Cox – Rhyl Sands
 William Powell Frith – Ramsgate Sands
 Holman Hunt – The Light of the World
 Daniel Maclise – The Marriage of Aoife and Strongbow
 John Everett Millais – John Ruskin
 Jean-François Millet – The Reaper
 Ferdinand Georg Waldmüller – Vienna Woods Landscape
 George Frederic Watts – Miss Mary Fox, with Spanish Pointer
 Antoine Wiertz – L'Inhumation précipitée
 Franz Xaver Winterhalter – Dalip Singh

Births
 January 1 – Louis Saint-Gaudens, American sculptor (died 1913)
 January 23 – Hans Brandstetter, Austrian sculptor (died 1925)
 February 10 – Giovanni Muzzioli, Italian painter (died 1894)
 April 19 – Charles Angrand, French neo-Impressionist painter (died 1926)
 May 21 – John F. Peto, American trompe-l'œil painter (died 1907)
 June 24 – Eleanor Norcross, American painter (died 1923)
 July 21 – Albert Edelfelt, Finnish painter (died 1905)
 August 6 – W. G. Collingwood, English painter and author (died 1932)
 August 12 – Sir Alfred Gilbert, English sculptor (died 1934)
 December 10 – Thomas Cooper Gotch, English painter (died 1931)
 Antonio Fabrés, Catalan painter (died 1938)

Deaths
 February 17 – John Martin, English painter and engraver (on the Isle of Man) (born 1789)
 March 13 – Luigi Pichler, German-Italian artist in engraved gems (born 1773)
 May 10 – George Clint, English portrait painter and engraver (born 1770)
 July 30 – Paolo Toschi, Italian draughtsman and engraver (born 1788)
 August 29 – William Brockedon, English painter and inventor (born 1787)
 September 20 – Frederick Catherwood, English artist and architect (born 1799)
 September 23 – Edward Wedlake Brayley, English antiquary and topographer (born 1773)
 September 29 – Jens Peter Møller, Danish painter (born 1783)
 November 24 – Carl Joseph Begas, German historical painter (born 1794)
 December 22 – Bengt Erland Fogelberg, Swedish sculptor (born 1786)

References

 
Years of the 19th century in art
1850s in art